The Vogelsbergkreis is a Kreis (district) in the middle of Hesse, Germany. Neighbouring districts are Schwalm-Eder, Hersfeld-Rotenburg, Fulda, Main-Kinzig, Wetteraukreis, Gießen and Marburg-Biedenkopf.

History
The district was created in 1972 by merging the former districts Alsfeld and Lauterbach.

Geography
The main feature of the district is the Vogelsberg, an extinct volcano, last active 7 million years ago.

Coat of arms
The lion in the bottom half is the lion of Hesse. The lilies in the upper part show the flowers of the martagon lily (German Türkenbund, Lilium martagon), a rare plant which grows in some protected areas of the district. The flowers were taken from the coat of arms of the Lauterbach district.

Towns and municipalities

References

External links

 Official website 
 Website of the district administration 
 Touristic website

 
Districts of Hesse
Vogelsberg